Carbonera Formation can refer to:
 Carbonera Formation, Mexico, Early Cretaceous geologic formation in Mexico
 Carbonera Formation, Colombia, Late Eocene to Early Miocene geologic formation in Colombia